Siushka is a rural locality (a village) in Donskoy Selsoviet, Belebeyevsky District, Bashkortostan, Russia. The population was 140 as of 2010. There are 3 streets.

Geography 
Siushka is located 9 km east of Belebey (the district's administrative centre) by road. Podlesnoye is the nearest rural locality.

References 

Rural localities in Belebeyevsky District